NGC 1981 (also known as OCL 525) is an open cluster which is located in the Orion constellation. It was discovered by John Herschel on 4 January 1827. Its apparent magnitude is 4.2  and its size is 28.00 arc minutes.  It lies to the north of the Orion Nebula, separated from it by the Sh2-279 region containing NGC 1973, 1975, and 1977.

Some say it looks like an alligator or crocodile, with its eastern star as the snout, its western star as its tail and the two groups of three stars in the middle of it as its two set of legs.

References

External links
 

Open clusters
Orion molecular cloud complex
1981
Orion (constellation)
Astronomical objects discovered in 1827
Discoveries by John Herschel
Orion–Cygnus Arm